Don Carlo Campora (August 30, 1927 – June 5, 1978) was an American gridiron football player and coach.  He played professionally in the National Football League (NFL) for the San Francisco 49ers in 1950 and 1952 and for the Washington Redskins in 1953.  In 1954, he played with the Calgary Stampeders of the Canadian Football League (CFL). Campora played college football at the University of the Pacific in Stockton, California and served as the school's head football coach from 1964 to 1965. He was selected by the 49ers in the second round with the 23rd overall pick of the 1950 NFL Draft.

Campora was a native of Stockton, where he attended high school. He worked as an assistant football coach at Arizona State University in 1951 under Larry Siemering, who coached Campora at Pacific. Campora served as a line coach at Stockton College (now known as a San Joaquin Delta College) from 1955 to 1957. He joined the coaching staff as his alma mater, Pacific, as line coach in December 1957.

Campora's tongue-in-cheek nickname was "Tiny". He was a teacher at Calaveras High School in San Andreas, California, in the 1970s.

Head coaching record

References

External links
 
 

1927 births
1978 deaths
American football tackles
American players of Canadian football
Canadian football tackles
Arizona State Sun Devils football coaches
Calgary Stampeders players
Pacific Tigers football coaches
Pacific Tigers football players
San Francisco 49ers players
Washington Redskins players
Junior college football coaches in the United States
People from Cache County, Utah
Players of American football from Stockton, California
Players of Canadian football from Stockton, California